Maccabi Tel Aviv Basketball Club, known for sponsorship reasons as Maccabi Playtika Tel Aviv, is a professional basketball club based in Tel Aviv, Israel. The team plays in the Israeli Basketball Premier League (the top tier of Israeli basketball), and internationally in the EuroLeague. Maccabi Tel Aviv is known as one of the best teams in Europe, having won 6 Euroleague titles since joining, and having sent numerous players to the NBA draft.

The club started in the mid-1930s, as part of the Maccabi Tel Aviv Sports Club, which had been founded in 1906.

With six EuroLeague championships (including the 2001 FIBA SuproLeague), one Adriatic League championship, 55 Israeli Basketball Premier League championships, 45 Israeli State Cup titles, and 10 Israeli League Cup titles, Maccabi has been the most successful basketball team in Israel, and is also one of the most successful basketball teams outside of North America. Players such as Tal Brody, Miki Berkovich, Jim Boatwright, Kevin Magee, Earl Williams, and Aulcie Perry; and more recently Derrick Sharp, Šarūnas Jasikevičius, Tal Burstein, Anthony Parker, and Nikola Vujčić, have been among the elite of Europe's basketball players.

History
The Israeli Basketball Super League started in 1954, and Maccabi Tel Aviv was the first champion. It has dominated the championship ever since, winning the title 54 times, including a run of 23 titles in a row between 1970 and 1992. The team has also won the Israeli Basketball State Cup 45 times. Maccabi is considered Israel's national sporting representative in the world.

From 1969 until 2008, Maccabi Tel Aviv was sponsored by Elite, Israel's largest food company, and carried its name. Since July 2008, Maccabi has had a new sponsor – Electra. In 2015 they switched their sponsor once again, this time to fashion chain FOX.

Since 1963, the club's home court has been the Yad Eliyahu Arena in Tel Aviv (later renamed "Menora Mivtachim Arena"). Originally an open-air court for 5,000 spectators, it is now a modern indoor arena with a capacity of 10,383.

Most Maccabi Tel Aviv head coaches have been former players of the club. Yehoshua Rozin was involved with the club for 40 years. Ralph Klein started as an 18-year-old player and later had several spells as a coach, and led the club to its first EuroLeague title in the 1977–78 season. Zvi Sherf played for Maccabi's second team, and coached the team for three spells. Pini Gershon played in the Youth Section, and as a coach led Maccabi to three EuroLeague titles; in 2001, 2004, and 2005.

Maccabi Tel Aviv has always provided the senior Israeli national basketball team with a large number of players. Five Maccabi players, headed by Avraham Shneur, were on the team that represented Israel in its first EuroBasket, in 1953 in Moscow.

Tanhum Cohen-Mintz was one of Europe's top centers in the sixties, and was selected to the first FIBA European Selection European All-Star Team, which played in Madrid in 1964. Miki Berkowitz, Motty Aroesti, Lou Silver, and Eric Minkin played a major part in winning the silver medal at the 1979 EuroBasket in Torino. Doron Jamchy played 16 years for the Israeli national team, and holds the record for appearances (191 international games) and points scored (3,515).

Maccabi Tel Aviv was the first Israeli club to enter the FIBA European Champions Cup (EuroLeague), in the 1958 season. Since then, it has played over 600 games in European-wide competitions, and was the only Israeli club to play in a FIBA European Cup Winners' Cup (FIBA Saporta Cup) Final (1967 Cup Winners' Cup), and to win the European-wide top-tier level EuroLeague on six occasions (1977, 1981, *2001 FIBA SuproLeague, 2004, 2005, and 2014). Maccabi has played in 15 EuroLeague Finals (1977, 1980, 1981, 1982, 1987, 1988, 1989, 2000, *2001 FIBA SuproLeague, 2004, 2005, 2006, 2008, 2011, and 2014). In 1994 Tel Aviv, and in 2004 in Tel Aviv, Maccabi organized the EuroLeague Final Four.

The first basketball game between an NBA and a FIBA team was held in 1978, in Tel Aviv. Maccabi Tel Aviv beat the defending NBA champion Washington Bullets, 98–97.

Maccabi Tel Aviv has played a record 18 times vs. NBA teams, and became the first European team to win on an NBA floor, when it beat the Toronto Raptors, 105–103, in 2005. It also beat the Phoenix Suns and Brooklyn Nets in 1984, to win a tournament in Tel Aviv.

Through the decades

1950s
5 Israeli League championships, 3 Israeli Cups.

Early success in the Israeli League. Rivalry with Hapoel Tel Aviv begins.

1960s

5 Israeli League championships, 4 Israeli Cups.

Establishment as an elite club with FIBA European All-Stars, such as center Tanhum Cohen-Mintz. Fierce rivalry with home-town foes, Hapoel Tel Aviv.

Tal Brody came to Israel in 1966 from the United States, after having been drafted #12 in the 1965 National Basketball Association Draft, originally just to take one year out of his life to play for Maccabi Tel Aviv. Ralph Klein, Israel's most successful coach at the time, said that up until the enthusiastic Brody's arrival, Israelis had only viewed basketball as a fun game. But within a year, with his serious attitude and his inspirational commitment, Brody had inculcated his teammates with his view of basketball as a way of life. At his urging, the team doubled the number of practices it held every week.

To capitalize on Brody's quickness and speed, the coach abandoned the team's formerly slow pace, in favor of a fast-paced motion game, built around fast breaks. Brody was the most dominant player in the European-wide second tier level FIBA European Cup Winners' Cup (FIBA Saporta Cup) in the 1966–67 season. In 1967, he was named Israel's Sportsman of the Year. The team made it through the first, second, and third rounds of the European Cup Winners' Cup's (Saporta Cup) playoffs, and reached the Finals, finishing second in the league.

For the first time, the Israeli Prime Minister (Levi Eshkol), the Israeli Defense Forces Chief of Staff, and Knesset members came to games. Demand for tickets to games in the team's 5,000-seat stadium was so high that they became exceedingly difficult to obtain.

1970s
1 FIBA European Champions Cup (EuroLeague), 10 Israeli League championships, 8 Israeli Cups.

The rise to the top in Europe. The first EuroLeague championship in 1977 was soon followed by another finals appearance in 1980. Tal Brody was the captain of that Maccabi Tel Aviv team.

1977 FIBA European Champions Cup: "We are on the map!"

The year 1977 was the apex of the Cold War, and the Soviet Union was boycotting Israel. In the first round of the FIBA European Champions Cup (EuroLeague) Maccabi Tel Aviv defeated Real Madrid, 94–85. In the second round, it beat BC Brno, Czechoslovakian League, for the first time, 91–76, on 15 February 1977.

In the FIBA European Champions Cup semifinals, Maccabi Tel Aviv was matched against CSKA Moscow – the  Red Army team. CSKA Moscow was a powerhouse. The Soviet Army team had won the prior USSR League championship. Six of its players had played on the Soviet national team that had defeated the United States in the 1972 Summer Olympics, and their captain was Sergei Belov. And the Communists were well known for using sports to glorify what they billed as their supremacy over the West.

The Soviet Union had broken off diplomatic relations with Israel a decade earlier, and politically and militarily backed Israel's Arab enemies. For political reasons, therefore, CSKA Moscow refused to play in Tel Aviv. And the Soviets also refused to grant visas to the Israelis, to allow them to come play in Moscow. In the end, Maccabi Tel Aviv's "home game" was played in the small, neutral town of Virton, Belgium.

The game took place in an emotional atmosphere. It was of huge symbolic value for Maccabi Tel Aviv fans, and for many Israelis who ordinarily had no interest in basketball. The game pitted the capitalist West against the Communist East, and Israel against the country that was supplying its enemies with weapons. The game also matched the country of Israel, with a total of a mere 4 million inhabitants, against the Soviets, with their 290 million people. The newspaper Maariv billed the 17 February 1977, game as "the fight between David and Goliath." Most of Israel's population watched the game, which was broadcast on Israel's only TV channel at the time.

Maccabi Tel Aviv upset the heavily favored Soviets, 91–79. The feeling among Israelis was not only that CSKA Moscow had been defeated, but that a victory – albeit small – had been achieved against the mighty Soviet Union. The game has for decades been recognized as a key event in the forging of Israel's national identity. Even decades later, it was being replayed repeatedly on Israeli television.

"We are on the map!" proclaimed a euphoric Tal Brody, in his heavily American-accented Hebrew, as a TV announcer pushed a microphone in front of him for a post-game quote, while people danced the hora around, him in excitement and celebration. "And we are staying on the map – not only in sports, but in everything." The phrase "We are on the map!" ("anachnu al hamapa, ve'anahnu nisharim al hamapa!"), a literal translation of an English phrase into his adopted language, but a novel saying in Hebrew, became a new, popular phrase in Israel. It reflected a physical victory by the nascent Jewish Zionist idea, and national pride. It became Israel's most famous quote, and a staple of Israeli speech.

Back home, hundreds of thousands of Israelis celebrated spontaneously in the streets, and 150,000 in Tel Aviv congregated in celebration in what is now Rabin Square. Many jumped into its fountain, splashing in water and champagne. Recalling the moment, an Israeli quoted in the book From Beirut to Jerusalem told author Thomas Friedman that on one level it was Brody the star basketball player and his teammates beating the Russians, but on another level it was "my grandfather beating them. It was our retroactive victory over the Cossacks."

The FIBA European Champions Cup Finals were played in Belgrade, Yugoslavia, on 7 April 1977. Yugoslavia was a Non-Aligned country that supported Palestine, and with which Israel did not have diplomatic relations, and the El Al plane that brought the Maccabi Tel Aviv players over to it for the game, was the first Israeli plane ever allowed to land there.

The Israelis were pitted against the highly favored Mobilgirgi Varese, the champions of Italy's top league. Mobilgirgi Varese had beaten the Israelis twice that year, and had beaten them in the European-wide second-tier level FIBA European Cup Winners' Cup (FIBA Saporta Cup) Finals, ten years earlier, when Brody first started playing for Maccabi Tel Aviv. Back in Israel, the entire country watched the game on television.

Maccabi Tel Aviv went on to defeat Mobilgirgi Varese by one point, 78–77, in the FIBA European Champions Cup Finals. Brody, as the team's captain, received the FIBA European Cup trophy from FIBA's Secretary General, and lifted it over his head. Jim Boatwright was the game's leading scorer, with 26 points.

It was Israel's first FIBA European Champions Cup title, in the 23-nation league. It was also the first time that Israel had won a championship of that caliber in any sport, and was, at the time, Israel's greatest achievement in international sports. The victory greatly lifted the spirit and morale of the country. In Israel, 200,000 people gathered to celebrate in Israel's National Park, and the event was celebrated as a national holiday. When the team returned home, it found 150,000 Israelis waiting for it.

1980s

1 FIBA European Champions Cup (EuroLeague), 1 FIBA Intercontinental Cup, 10 Israeli League championships, 8 Israeli Cups.

A golden era of the Maccabi Tel Aviv ball club. Throughout the 1970s and 1980s, Maccabi dominated the Israeli Basketball Super League, winning all 20 league championships in a row. Winning the FIBA European Champions Cup (EuroLeague) title in 1981, and reaching the FIBA European Champions Cup Finals for four more times, in 1982, 1987, 1988, and 1989. Miki Berkovich 1971–75, and 1976–88, Motti Aroesti 1974–88, Doron Jamchi 1985–96 and 1999–2000, Kevin Magee 1984–90, Lou Silver 1975–85, Ken Barlow 1987–90, Aulcie Perry 1976–85, and LaVon Mercer 1988–95 were the superstars of that Maccabi run.

1981 FIBA European Champions Cup championship
Maccabi Tel Aviv beat Sinudyne Bologna, 80–79, in the Finals game, in Strasbourg, under head coach Rudy D'Amico. It was proof that Maccabi was at the top of European professional club basketball for good.

1990s

9 Israeli League championships, 5 Israeli Cups.

For Maccabi Tel Aviv there was no European-wide title in the decade, and the team had struggles in European competitions. However, the club was still considered to be one of the European powerhouses of that era, as the club then featured European All-Stars such as Doron Jamchy and Oded Kattash, as well LaVon Mercer. With the exception of 1993, Maccabi absolutely dominated the Israel League, winning every championship.

2000s
3 EuroLeague championships, 9 Israeli League championships, 7 Israeli Cups, 1 Israeli League Cup.

The "second golden era" of Maccabi Tel Aviv, making it the second most successful European basketball club of that decade. Maccabi made it to the FIBA EuroLeague's title game in 2000, which marked the start of Maccabi's second "golden era", the most successful of the club to date. During this decade, the club won three EuroLeague championships, in 2001 (FIBA SuproLeague), 2004, and 2005 respectively. They also reached the European title game on two more occasions, in 2006 and 2008. Ariel McDonald 1999–2002, Anthony Parker 2000–02 and 2003–06, Nate Huffman 1999–2002, Šarūnas Jasikevičius 2003–05, Maceo Baston 2003–06, Derrick Sharp 1996–2011, Nikola Vujčić 2002–08, and Tal Burstein 2000–09 and 2010–12 were the top players of Maccabi during this era.

2001 FIBA SuproLeague championship

The return to European glory for the club. This was the only year in European-wide professional club basketball history, with two recognized top-tier level European-wide champions, from two different organizations. Maccabi Tel Aviv was recognized as the winner of the traditional FIBA tournament, which had been renamed from the FIBA EuroLeague, to the FIBA SuproLeague; and Kinder Bologna, which was recognized as the champions of the newly established EuroLeague, which was organized by EuroLeague Basketball.

2004 and 2005, back-to-back EuroLeague championships
Maccabi Tel Aviv fans did not have to wait too much for another big title, as it all clicked in the 2003–04 season. Sharp's miracle three-pointer to survive the EuroLeague Top 16 that year has become one of the classic shots in European basketball history, and is unforgettable for any Maccabi fan. Once in the 2004 EuroLeague Final Four, Maccabi turned in a record breaking performance, with an outstanding 118-point title game performance. Maccabi won back-to-back EuroLeague titles in 2005, becoming the first team to do so since 1991. The players Šarūnas Jasikevičius, Anthony Parker, Tal Burstein, Maceo Baston, and Nikola Vujčić, coached by Pini Gershon, became a classic lineup in European basketball history. This team of 2003–04 and 2004–05 is generally considered one of the best basketball teams in European club history, and certainly one of the most fun to watch ever in basketball history. After starting point guard "Saras" Jasikevičius left the team, to fulfill his lifelong dream and play in the NBA, Maccabi went back to the EuroLeague Final, in the 2005–06 season, but CSKA Moscow stood in the way of a three-peat. Anthony Parker and Maceo Baston left after that year, and returned home, signing multi-million dollar contracts with NBA teams. Center Nikola Vujčić stayed with Maccabi for two more years, playing in one more final, in the 2007–08 season, before leaving the team, and signing a multi-million dollar deal with Olympiacos. Israeli Super League legends Derrick Sharp and Tal Burstein, remained with Maccabi, and continued to play for the team until 2011 and 2012, respectively. Maccabi also dominated the Israel League, winning every tournament from 1993 to 2007, and winning multiple Cup tournaments.

2010s

1 EuroLeague Championship, 5 Israeli League championships, 8 Israeli Cups, 6 Israeli League Cups, 1 Adriatic League championship.

For the 2010–11 season, management brought back head coach David Blatt, and added new premier players. Maccabi Tel Aviv reeled off nine consecutive wins to finish the EuroLeague regular season. Highlights included David Blu's game-winning triple against Khmki, Sofoklis Schortsanitis's dominance inside, and the defense of steals leaders Chuck Eidson and Doron Perkins. The momentum ended with a road loss at Regal FC Barcelona, at the start of the EuroLeague Top 16, but Maccabi surged again with three straight wins to reach the EuroLeague playoffs. Barca handed Maccabi another loss, this time in Tel Aviv – the only home defeat of the season – and ended Blatt's hopes for home-court advantage, in the next stage against Caja Laboral.

Maccabi Tel Aviv prevailed in the EuroLeague playoff series, as the injured Perkins' replacement in the starting lineup, Guy Pnini, set a single-game-career-high in scoring, along the way, and the team moved on to the 2011 Final Four. Jeremy Pargo finished with the best performance index rating, and the second-most points per game, among all playoffs participants. He also ranked among the top five players in three-pointers made, assists, and steals. Backup center Richard Hendrix was named MVP of the first round of the EuroLeague Playoffs, and finished as the overall playoff leader in rebounds and blocks. Maccabi Tel Aviv beat Real Madrid in the EuroLeague semifinals, 82–63, advancing to the EuroLeague Final game. On 8 May 2011, Maccabi lost the final game, 70–78, to Panathinaikos. With the exception of 2008 and 2010, Maccabi, up to 2011, also won every Israeli League from 1993.

Maccabi announced that it would join the Adriatic League for the 2011–12 season, joining the league for the second time, as it had also joined the league for the 2002–03 season, when it reached the League's finals game. This was supposed to bridge the gap between the highest basketball level Maccabi engages in, in the EuroLeague, and the low-level Israeli league.

On 3 August 2011, NBA point guard Jordan Farmar of the New Jersey Nets signed a one-year contract with Maccabi Tel Aviv, in the wake of the 2011 NBA lockout. He played for the team during the lockout. It was reported on 14 November 2011, that Maccabi also agreed to terms with Israeli NBA small forward Omri Casspi, to join the team in several weeks. However, the end of the NBA lockout, and the 25 December 2011 start date for the 2011–12 season, brought Casspi and Farmar back from Tel Aviv, to join their NBA teams (Cleveland and Brooklyn, respectively).

Maccabi Tel Aviv ended the season winning four titles: the Israeli League Cup, the Israeli State Cup, the Israeli Super League, and the Adriatic League.  In the 2012–13 season, Maccabi won the Israeli League Cup and the Israeli State Cup, and reached the EuroLeague playoffs, losing to Real Madrid 0:3. In the Israeli Super League, Maccabi suffered a huge disappointment, as they lost to Maccabi Haifa 79:86 in the finals.

2014 EuroLeague championship
In the 2013–14 EuroLeague season, Maccabi Tel Aviv finished first in their regular season group. The team went on to finish third in their top 16 group, leading to a best-of-5 playoff series against Emporio Armani Milano, without the home-court advantage.
In the first game, Maccabi stunned the hosts from Milano, by turning a 7-point deficit, with 30 seconds remaining on the clock, into a 101–99 overtime victory. Maccabi then won two home games, to win the series 3–1, and to secure its place in the 2014 EuroLeague Final Four.

In the EuroLeague semifinals, Maccabi came from behind to defeat the heavily favored CSKA Moscow, with a last-second basket, after CSKA had been up by 15 points late in the game. Tyrese Rice scored the game-winning lay-up, with 5.5 seconds to go.

Maccabi Tel Aviv head coach David Blatt admitted after the semifinal that Maccabi had overshot every possible expectation during the season. When asked if the sky was the limit, Blatt said that "in this storm of a season, Maccabi long ago touched the sky, and reached the moon".

On 18 May 2014, Maccabi Tel Aviv won its sixth EuroLeague championship, after it defeated Real Madrid, by a score of 98–86, in overtime, to win the EuroLeague championship. Tyrese Rice was named the EuroLeague Final Four MVP. The game received worldwide media attention, after in response to Real Madrid's loss to Maccabi, over 18,000 anti-Semitic messages were posted on Twitter, in an outpouring of hatred against Jews. Maccabi entered the EuroLeague Finals as an underdog, with few expecting the team to even make it into the EuroLeague Final Four, let alone to go all the way and win the championship.

Following the success of winning the EuroLeague championship, Maccabi Tel Aviv's head coach David Blatt was hired to be the head coach of the NBA's Cleveland Cavaliers. Blatt's assistant, Guy Goodes was then appointed as his replacement at Maccabi.

2014 FIBA International Cup
After winning the 2014 Euroleague Championship, Maccabi Tel Aviv was invited by FIBA to play 2014 FIBA Intercontinental Cup against Brazil's Flamengo, who won the 2014 FIBA Americas League. The two-game aggregate score tournament took place at the HSBC Arena in Rio de Janeiro, Brazil, on 26–28 September 2014, to determine the champion. After beating Flamengo at the first game by 69–66, Maccabi lost the second game by 90–77. The aggregate score was 156–146, which made Flamengo the 2014 FIBA International Cup champion. Guy Goodes was Maccabi's coach at these two games.

2014–15 season

Head coach David Blatt left Maccabi to coach the Cleveland Cavaliers. Assistant coach Guy Goodes was promoted to head coach. In the 2014–15 season, Maccabi Tel Aviv was defeated 2–3 in the Super League Semifinals by Hapoel Eilat. It was the first time in 22 years that Maccabi would not play in the Finals. In the EuroLeague, Maccabi lost in the playoffs to Fenerbahçe Ülker 0:3.

2015–2017 Seasons: Downfall

Starting from the 2015–16 season, the team was named Maccabi FOX Tel Aviv, referring to the new main fashion line sponsor. New players were signed, including some proven players such as Taylor Rochestie and Vítor Faverani. Jordan Farmar returned, and prospect Dragan Bender gained more playing time as well.

After a slow start in the EuroLeague (1–3) and Israeli League (3–2), head coach Goodes was sacked on 9 November 2015. On 14 November, Žan Tabak signed a deal to become the head coach of Maccabi. Tabak lead the team to an Israeli Cup victory. Maccabi Tel Aviv was eventually eliminated from the EuroLeague after the regular season, and played in the 2015–16 Eurocup Basketball Last 32 phase, but failed to qualify for the playoffs after a loss at home to BC Nizhny Novgorod. The Israeli League season proved to be a disaster, when Maccabi was eliminated in the semifinal for the second season in a row, this time by the eventual champions in Maccabi Rishon LeZion.  This started a three-year spell of not doing well in either league.

The 2016–17 season was even worse for Maccabi Tel Aviv. During the summer, solid players such as Sonny Weems and Andrew Goudelock were signed, in hopes that they would lead Maccabi back to glory. Erez Edelstein was named the head coach. However, the season began with difficulties in both the Israeli League, and with losses in the EuroLeague, and Edelstein was fired. Assistant Rami Hadar briefly served as coach, before resigning after a series of losses, and Maccabi hired Ainars Bagatskis, who served as David Blatt's assistant in Darüşşafaka, as the new head coach. While Maccabi won the Israeli Cup with a win over rival Hapoel Jerusalem, in the EuroLeague, Maccabi finished in 14th place in the new format, while only finishing in 4th place in the Israeli League regular season. Bagatskis was fired just before the playoffs, with Arik Shivek becoming the new head coach for Maccabi. Maccabi made the 2017 Israeli Basketball Super League Final Four, but suffered a shocking loss to Maccabi Haifa in the semifinals, on the home Menora Mivtachim Arena floor. After the season, longtime player Devin Smith, with the team since the 2011–12 season, announced his retirement.

2017–2020

Neven Spahija returned to Maccabi Tel Aviv as the new head coach, having coached the team in the 2006–07 season. Forming a completely new team, Maccabi had a successful season – in the Euroleague, Maccabi fought for most of the season for a place in the playoffs, falling short only in the end, but finishing in 10th place, a huge improvement from the previous Euroleague seasons. In Israel, while Maccabi lost the Israeli State Cup for the first time since 2008, to Hapoel Holon, Maccabi won the Israel League Cup. In the Israeli League, Maccabi finished in 1st place in the regular season, and dominated in the playoffs, finishing by winning the 2018 Israeli Basketball Premier League Final Four, defeating Hapoel Tel Aviv 98:74 in the semifinals, and crushing Cup winner Hapoel Holon 95:75 in the finals, winning their first Israeli League since 2014. Alex Tyus was named the MVP.

For the 2018-19 season Maccabi Tel Aviv had high hopes. Coach Spahija started the season, but after four consecutive losses and a 1–6 start to the 2018–19 EuroLeague Season, Maccabi fired Spahija and hired Ioannis Sfairopoulos as the head coach. Maccabi improved, and nearly qualified for the Euroleague playoffs, though a few losses in the end prevented the team from qualification. Maccabi finished 10th. While Maccabi lost both Cup tournaments, they dominated the Israeli League – winning both 1st place in the regular season, and the 2019 Israeli Basketball Premier League Final Four tournament, held in Tel Aviv, to win the Israeli League for the second consecutive season, with John DiBartolomeo winning the MVP award.

2020–present
In the 2020–21 season, Maccabi Tel Aviv started off with no fans in attendance due to the COVID-19 pandemic in Israel, and got off to a rocky start, winning 14 out of 34 Euroleague games. In the Winners League, Maccabi beat Hapoel Gilboa Galil to win the Israeli finals series 2–1, to win its 55th championship.

Through the summer of 2021, Maccabi signed Jalen Reynolds who had already played for the club, alongside James Nunnally and Derrick Williams.

Due to the Russian invasion of Ukraine, the records of all regular season matches against Russian teams were  annulled, and team won-loss records adjusted accordingly, dramatically affecting league standings. In the case of Maccabi Tel Aviv, it had lost three of four games against the Russian teams.

Arena

Menora Mivtachim Arena

Menora Mivtachim Arena in Tel Aviv with a capacity of 10,383 is the team's arena since 1964.

Supporters
Maccabi Tel Aviv is widely recognised as "The State Club" for representing the State of Israel and the Jewish People around Europe and around the world, attracting huge crowds of local Jews at every away game.

In Yad Eliyahu Arena Maccabi is followed by one organised group: "The GATE" which was founded in 2017 after the merger of two organized groups, the first one is "Gate 11" and the second one is "Gate 7".

Accomplishments per season

In European and worldwide competitions

Players

Current roster

EuroLeague Depth chart

Ligat HaAl Depth chart

Squad changes for the 2022–23 season

In

{{Bs player|no = 8 |pos = SF |nat =

Out

Franchise leaders
Points scored in the EuroLeague

  Miki Berkovich – 3,588
  Doron Jamchi – 3,262
  Kevin Magee – 2,081
  Aulcie Perry – 2,077
  Lou Silver – 1,999
  Anthony Parker – 1,804
  Scottie Wilbekin – 1,801
  Derrick Sharp – 1,755
  Nikola Vujčić – 1,730
  Scottie Wilbekin – 1,629
  Devin Smith – 1,539
  Nadav Henefeld – 1,519
  Jim Boatwright – 1,481
  Tal Brody – 1,378
  David Blu – 1,244
  Earl Williams – 1,227
  Tal Burstein – 1,224

Points scored in the Israeli League

  Miki Berkovich – 6,060
  Tanhum Cohen-Mintz – 5,170
  Doron Jamchi – 4,896
  Tal Brody – 4,049
  Kevin Magee – 3,215
  Lou Silver – 3,195
  Ralph Klein – 2,817
  Derrick Sharp – 2,664
  Nadav Henefeld – 2,438
  Jim Boatwright – 2,282
  Motti Daniel – 2,281
  Aulcie Perry – 2,171
  Motti Aroesti – 2,067
  Tal Burstein – 2,043
  Micha Schwartz – 1,963

Honors
Total titles: 115

Domestic competitions
Israeli League
 Winners (55): 1953–54, 1954–55, 1956–57, 1957–58, 1958–59, 1961–62, 1962–63, 1963–64, 1966–67, 1967–68, 1969–70, 1970–71, 1971–72, 1972–73, 1973–74, 1974–75, 1975–76, 1976–77, 1977–78, 1978–79, 1979–80, 1980–81, 1981–82, 1982–83, 1983–84, 1984–85, 1985–86, 1986–87, 1987–88, 1988–89, 1989–90, 1990–91, 1991–92, 1993–94, 1994–95, 1995–96, 1996–97, 1997–98, 1998–99, 1999–2000, 2000–01, 2001–02, 2002–03, 2003–04, 2004–05, 2005–06, 2006–07, 2008–09, 2010–11, 2011–12, 2013–14, 2017–18, 2018–19, 2019–20, 2020–21
 Runners-up (7): 1959–60, 1960–61, 1965–66, 1968–69, 2007–08, 2009–10, 2012–13

Israeli Cup
 Winners (45): 1955–56, 1957–58, 1958–59, 1960–61, 1962–63, 1963–64, 1965–66, 1969–70, 1970–71, 1971–72, 1972–73, 1974–75, 1976–77, 1977–78, 1978–79, 1979–80, 1980–81, 1981–82, 1982–83, 1984–85, 1985–86, 1986–87, 1988–89, 1989–90, 1990–91, 1993–94, 1997–98, 1998–99, 1999–2000, 2000–01, 2001–02, 2002–03, 2003–04, 2004–05, 2005–06, 2009–10, 2010–11, 2011–12, 2012–13, 2013–14, 2014–15, 2015–16, 2016–17, 2020–21
 Runners-up (7): 1961–62, 1968–69, 1995–96, 1996–97, 2007–08, 2017–18, 2022–23

Israeli League Cup 
 Winners (10): 2007, 2010, 2011, 2012, 2013, 2015, 2017, 2020, 2021, 2022
 Runners-up (4): 2009, 2014, 2016, 2019

European competitions
EuroLeague
 Winners (6): 1976–77, 1980–81, 2000–01, 2003–04, 2004–05, 2013–14
 Runners-up (9): 1979–80, 1981–82, 1986–87, 1987–88, 1988–89, 1999–00, 2005–06, 2007–08, 2010–11
 Semifinalist (1): 2001–02
 3rd place (3): 1978–79, 1984–85, 1990–91
 4th place (1): 1977–78
 Final Four (12): 1988, 1989, 1991, 2000, 2001, 2002, 2004, 2005, 2006, 2008, 2011, 2014
FIBA Saporta Cup (defunct)
 Runners-up (1): 1966–67
European Super Cup (semi-official, defunct)
 Winners (1): 1991
 3rd place (1): 1990

Regional competitions
Adriatic League
 Winners (1): 2011–12
 Runners-up (1): 2002–03

Worldwide competitions
FIBA Intercontinental Cup
 Winners (1): 1980
 Runners-up (1): 2014
 3rd place (2): 1977, 1982
 4th place (1): 1987

Other competitions
FIBA International Christmas Tournament (defunct)
 Winners (1): 2002
 Runners-up (1): 1991
 3rd place (1): 1990
 4th place (2): 1989, 1992
Tel Aviv, Israel Invitational Game:
 Winners (5): 2009, 2010, 2011, 2015, 2020
 Runners-up (1): 2016
Bamberg, Germany Invitational Game:
 Winners (1): 2009
Frankfurt, Germany Invitational Game
 Winners (1): 2009
Wroclaw Invitational Tournament
 Winners (1): 2010
Tournoi d'Angers, France
 Winners (1): 2011
Bonn, Germany Invitational Game
 Winners (1): 2014
Gomelsky Cup
 Runners-up (1): 2015
Eilat, Israel Invitational Game
 Winners (1): 2017
Pro Stars Tournament
 Winners (2): 2015, 2019

Individual club awards
Triple Crown
 Winners (6): 1976–77, 1980–81, 2000–01, 2003–04, 2004–05, 2013–14

Matches against NBA teams

Notes:
 First European team to defeat an NBA team.
 First European team to defeat an NBA team on North American soil.

Notable players

Bold indicates Maccabi Hall of Famers (Sources: maccabi.co.il)

2010s

  Tyler Dorsey 2 seasons: '19-'21
 Elijah Bryant 2 seasons: '19-'21
 Othello Hunter 2 seasons: '19-'21
 Nate Wolters 2 seasons: '19-'20
 Tarik Black 2 seasons: '18-'20
 Johnny O'Bryant III 1 season: '18-'19
  Deni Avdija 3 seasons: '17-'20
  DeAndre Kane 2 seasons: '17-'19
  Michael Roll 2 seasons: '17-'19
 Jonah Bolden 1 season: '17-'18
 Deshaun Thomas 1 season: '17-'18
 Norris Cole 1 season: '17-'18
 Pierre Jackson 1 season: '17-'18
 Andrew Goudelock 1 season: '16-'17
 Yovel Zoosman 5 seasons: '15-'21
 Brian Randle 2 seasons: '14-'16
  Tyrese Rice 1 season: '13-'14
 Joe Ingles 1 season: '13-'14
  Alex Tyus 4 seasons: '13-'15, '17-'19
  Ricky Hickman 2 seasons: '12-'14
 Itay Segev 4 seasons: '12-'13, '15-'18
  Sylven Landesberg 5 seasons: '12-'17
 Devin Smith 6 seasons: '11-'17
 Yogev Ohayon 6 seasons: '11-'17
 Shawn James 3 seasons: '11-'14
  Jordan Farmar 2 seasons: '11, '15-'16
 Keith Langford 1 season: '11-'12
 Sofoklis Schortsanitis 4 seasons: '10-'12, '13-'15
 Jeremy Pargo 4 seasons: '10-'11, '14-'15, '18-'19
  Richard Hendrix 3 seasons: '10-'12, '16

2000s

 Gal Mekel 3 seasons: '09-'10, '16-'17
 Guy Pnini 8 seasons: '09-17
 Doron Perkins 2 seasons: '09-'11
 Chuck Eidson 2 seasons: '09-'11
 Alan Anderson 1 season: '09-'10
  D'or Fischer 2 seasons: '08-'10 
 Carlos Arroyo 1 season: '08-'09
 Terence Morris 1 season: '07-'08
 Lior Eliyahu 6 seasons: '06-'09, '10-'13
 Will Bynum 2 seasons: '06-'08
 Omri Casspi 5 seasons: '05-'09, '19-21
  Jamie Arnold 2 seasons: '05-'07
 Yaniv Green 6 seasons: '04-'07, '08-'11
 Maceo Baston 3 seasons: '03-'06
 Šarūnas Jasikevičius 2 seasons: '03-'05
  Deon Thomas 2 seasons: '03-'05 
  David Blu 7 seasons: '02-'04, '07-'08, '09-'14 
 Nikola Vujčić 6 seasons: '02-'08
 Beno Udrih 1 season: '02-'03
 Yotam Halperin 6 seasons: '01-'05, '06-'08
 Tal Burstein 11 seasons: '00-'09, '10-'12
 Anthony Parker 5 seasons: '00-'02, '03-'06

1990s

 Nate Huffman 3 seasons: '99-'02
  Ariel McDonald 3 seasons: '99-'02
  Mark Brisker 3 seasons: '99-'02 
 Gur Shelef 7 seasons: '98-'05
 Rashard Griffith 1 season: '97-'98
  Derrick Sharp 15 seasons: '96-'11
 Doron Sheffer 5 seasons: '96-'00, '02-'03
  Constantin Popa 4 seasons: '96-'00
  Velibor Radović 4 seasons: '96-'99, '00-'01 
 Randy White 2 seasons: '96-'98
 Oded Kattash 4 seasons: '95-'99 
  Brad Leaf 3 seasons: '95-'98
 Tom Chambers 1 season: '95-'96
  Radisav Ćurčić 4 seasons: '94-'96, '00-'02 
 Wendell Alexis 1 season: '93-'94
 David Ancrum 1 season: '92-'93
 Nadav Henefeld 12 seasons: '91-'02
 Guy Goodes 8 seasons: '90-'97, '98-'99

1980s

  LaVon Mercer 6 seasons: '88-'94
 Motti Daniel 9 seasons: '87-'96
  Willie Sims 5 seasons: '87-'92
 Ken Barlow 3 season: '87-'90
 Doron Jamchi 12 seasons: '85-'96, '99-'00
 Kevin Magee 6 season: '84-'90
 Lee Johnson 3 season: '84-'87
 Hen Lippin 9 season: '83-'92
  Howard Lassoff 6 season: '81-'87

1970s

  Earl Williams 4 seasons: '79-'83
 Shmuel Zysman 3 seasons: '78-'81
  Aulcie Perry 9 seasons: '76-'85
 Shuki Schwartz 5 seasons: '76-'81
  Lou Silver 10 seasons: '75-'85
  Bob Griffin 3 seasons: '75-'78
 Motti Aroesti 14 seasons: '74-'88
  Jim Boatwright 8 seasons: '74-'82
  Eric Minkin 6 seasons: '73-'79
 Miki Berkovich 16 seasons: '71-'88
  Ronald Green 2 seasons: '70-'71

1950–60s

 Gabi Noimark 8 seasons: '67-'75
 Micha Schwartz 9 seasons: '67-'76
  Tal Brody 14 seasons: '66-'80
 Avraham Hoffman 5 seasons: '63-'68
 Haim Shtarkman 13 seasons: '63-'76
 Amnon Avidan 9 seasons: '62-'71
 Shabtai Ben-Basat 9 seasons: '57-'69
 Tanhum Cohen-Mintz 14 seasons: '58-'72
 Abraham Shneior 5 seasons: '54-'59
 Ralph Klein 12 seasons: '53-'65

Notable head coaches 

  Rudy D'Amico
   David Blatt
  Yehoshua Rozin
  Ralph Klein
  Zvi Sherf
  Pini Gershon

References

External links 

Maccabi Tel Aviv Basketball Official Telegram
EuroLeague Team Page
Maccabi Tel Aviv B.C. at Eurobasket.com

 
Tel Aviv B.C.
Basketball teams established in 1932
EuroLeague clubs
EuroLeague-winning clubs
Tel Aviv B.C.
Israeli Basketball Premier League teams